The Way of Kings is an epic fantasy novel written by American author Brandon Sanderson and the first book in The Stormlight Archive series. The novel was published on August 31, 2010, by Tor Books. The Way of Kings consists of one prelude, one prologue, 75 chapters, an epilogue and 9 interludes. It was followed by Words of Radiance in 2014, Oathbringer in 2017 and Rhythm of War in 2020. A leatherbound edition was released in 2021.

In 2011, it won the David Gemmell Legend Award for best novel. The unabridged audiobook is read by narrator team Michael Kramer and Kate Reading.

Development
Sanderson started working on pieces of The Way of Kings in the late 1990s and finished the first draft in 2003. Its publication was delayed when Sanderson instead decided to focus on his Mistborn trilogy. The original, non-canon version, The Way of Kings Prime is available on the official website of the author.

On June 10, 2010, the prologue and the first three chapters of the book were released, along with an introduction by Sanderson, as a preview on the Tor website. On July 8, 2010, the next three chapters (4–6) were released in audio format. On August 5, 2010, chapters 9 and 11 were released. Tor wrote that they did not release chapters 7, 8, and 10 because they wanted to focus on the storyline of Kaladin, one of the main characters. On August 26, 2010, chapters 12 and 13 were released.

Plot
The story rotates between the points of view of Kaladin, Shallan Davar, Szeth-son-son-Vallano, Dalinar Kholin, Adolin Kholin, and several other minor characters, who lead seemingly unconnected lives. Szeth, a Shin man cast out by his people and condemned to obey his constantly changing masters, is sent to assassinate the king of one of the world's most powerful nations, Alethkar. As the story progresses, he continuously changes hands, doing his best to hide the fact that he possesses an Honorblade, a mythical blade used by the Heralds that can cut through any material. He also possesses access to powers that are no longer available to normal humans (“Surgebinding”), once possessed by the Knights Radiant and thought lost, making him incredibly difficult to defeat in battle.

When Szeth was sent to kill the Alethi King Gavilar, the Parshendi, a race similar to the docile  slaves of other nations, claimed responsibility for the assassination. Gavilar's son, Elhokar, then goes to war with the Parshendi. The story shifts to the viewpoint of Highprince Dalinar Kholin, the brother of the murdered king. Before he died, his brother directed Dalinar to an ancient tome called "The Way of Kings", which leads Dalinar to start questioning the warlike and competitive Alethkar way of life. He also begins to experience visions in which he sees the ancient Knights Radiant. For Dalinar, these visions not only cast doubt on the mistaken history of the Radiants, they also begin to reveal the truth about the Voidbringers and the current state of the world. All of these events make Dalinar reluctant to fight in battle. Dalinar's conviction is questioned by those closest to him, casting heavy doubt on his sanity and bringing into question his claim to leadership.  In the political unrest of the age, perceived weakness is cause for others to attempt to eliminate him.

Meanwhile, the story also follows Kaladin, a darkeyed villager with a burning hatred for lighteyed nobles. Trained in his youth as a surgeon, Kaladin volunteered to go to war for the army of a local lord named Amaram, to watch over and protect his brother, Tien, on the field of battle. In his third battle, Kaladin fails to protect his brother, who is killed. This drives Kaladin to become a better fighter, resolving to protect others from the same fate. During a later battle, Kaladin succeeds in killing an enemy Shardbearer, and could claim the enemy's Shardblade and Shardplate by right, becoming a lighteyes himself. However, he rejects the Shardblade and Shardplate and is then betrayed by Brightlord Amaram, who takes the treasures for himself and brands Kaladin a slave to hide the theft. This event cements Kaladin's hatred for nobles and leaves deep emotional scars. After a number of escape attempts, he is forced into service as a bridgeman in an army battling the Parshendi on the Shattered Plains. Bridgemen are used strategically as bait for the opposing armies' archers, allowed to die so that the trained army can attack more easily. Kaladin manages to rally the other men in his group and turns them into a team that can survive. After he accidentally ruins a battle by changing tactics, he is beaten violently and left outside during a highstorm to die. However, he manages to survive. As a result of his unlikely survival, he begins to discover that he possesses the Surgebinding ability. As he struggles to find a way for his men to escape their lives as bridgemen, he comes to terms with his powers and begins to learn how to use them.

Shallan, a minor lighteyed woman whose family and lands are in danger, hatches a daring plot to switch a broken Soulcaster (a device that allows people to change objects to other things) with a working one belonging to Jasnah Kholin, sister of the Alethi king. She petitions Jasnah to become her ward, and through persistent effort she manages to gain Jasnah's confidence and becomes her apprentice. After successfully stealing the Soulcaster, she is frustrated by her inability to use it until one fateful day, when she accidentally turns a goblet into blood. Knowing Jasnah will soon arrive on the scene, Shallan breaks a pitcher and cuts herself to make it seem as though the blood was hers, which Jasnah mistakes for a suicide attempt. Shallan soon discovers that Jasnah's Soulcaster does not possess the ability to transmute, but instead hides her uncommon inherent ability to Soulcast. When Jasnah learns that Shallan also has the inherent ability to Soulcast, she forgives the girl for trying to steal her Soulcaster and begins instructing her in the proper use of their shared power. She also reveals her research into the origins of the Knights Radiant and Voidbringers and prepares Shallan and herself to travel to the Shattered Plains to meet with Jasnah's uncle Dalinar.

Setting
The backstory of the novel revolves around recurring disasters known as Desolations, where monstrous Voidbringers ravage the world and human survival hangs in the balance. To counter the threat, the Knights Radiant (so named for their glowing aura and eyes) possess magical armor and swords known as Shardplate and Shardblades as well as magical powers. The last Desolation was believed to be the final one, and has become a time of myths and legends, in particular as the Knights Radiant left behind their weapons and armor and disappeared into obscurity. Their discarded armor and swords remain as some of the most priceless heirlooms.

The magic of the world is based on gemstones that glow with light for many weeks after recurring, powerful storms known as highstorms. These commonplace gemstones are also used as mundane currency in merchant transactions, as well as interior lighting at night in wealthy houses and palaces. Drawing in this "stormlight" energy is what fuels the magical talismans of priest-wizards (the gem encrusted gloves called Soulcasters) that convert matter into another form, such as stone into grain, or people into stone, and powered gemstone constructs known as fabrials, such as a fabrial that creates red light and heat to replace wood in a fireplace. Soulcasting and fabrials are typically only owned by the nobility. In Alethkar, nobility is also based on eye color, blue eyes being seen as the purest royalty due to the association with the legendary Knights Radiant, who had glowing eyes.

The world itself has flora and fauna which have adapted to the common, and extremely powerful highstorms. Most animal life is based on crustaceans, most of which can burrow into the ground to survive a highstorm. Plant life is also mobile, in that it retracts into the ground to survive highstorms. Because all highstorms come from the eastern ocean and travel west, the western side of rocks and mountains harbor plant and animal life. Also, spirits called  exist and react to the emotions of people and the environment. High wind will have  in the form of ribbons of light that flow with it. Suffering from pain will cause red  to appear around the wound, and giving a noble, heartfelt speech will have  of golden, twinkling lights form a halo around the head of the speaker.  are so common that many people take them for granted.

Viewpoint characters
The primary chapters within the book are told from the viewpoint of several major characters, while the book's interludes are told from the viewpoint of other characters (not all of which repeat).

Main
Szeth-son-son-Vallano: An assassin from the land of Shinovar. He refers to himself as a "Truthless", who must serve those who bear his Oathstone. Bearer of an Honorblade and wielder of Stormlight. His Windrunner abilities are granted by his Honorblade. He hates being forced to murder and weeps as he does.
Kaladin: A darkeyes from the nation of Alethkar, who is forced to serve on a bridge crew in the army of Highprince Torol Sadeas. Formerly an apprentice learning surgery from his father and a member of the army of Brightlord Amaram, he hates lighteyes because of Amaram. Amaram betrayed Kaladin, by first causing the death of his brother, Tien, and after Kaladin saves him from a man in Shardplate, forcibly takes the Shards for himself, killing all of Kaladin's close friends in the process. Kaladin is able to use Stormlight to heal himself and make himself stronger and faster than any normal human being. He is accompanied by an  named Sylphrena, or Syl for short. She came to him because of his innate honor and kindness in the face of the evil and betrayal that seem to surround him. Kaladin's connection with Syl is what gives him his power with Stormlight; it also gives Syl the level of sentience she possesses.
Shallan Davar: A minor lighteyes from the nation of Jah Keved. Her family has fallen on hard times after the death of her father. She seeks to be accepted as the ward and student of the renowned scholar Jasnah Kholin, sister to King Elhokar of Alethkar. A skilled artist who can with a single glance remember and recreate a scene with charcoal and paper, she learns that she is able to Soulcast without a Soulcaster, just like Jasnah. Though the beginning of the book has her plotting to steal Jasnah's Soulcaster to save her family, she has become Jasnah's true apprentice by the end of the book.
Dalinar Kholin: A highprince of Alethkar, brother to the slain King Gavilar, uncle to the current king. Nicknamed the Blackthorn. A general who helped unite the kingdom with his brother. A man who experiences visions during the highstorms, and a Full Shardbearer, he is criticized as weak after he begins to follow the Codes and talks about stopping the pointless war Alethkar is engaged in.
Adolin Kholin: A lighteyes of Alethkar and heir to his father Dalinar's highprince seat. A skilled duelist and a Full Shardbearer, he loves and respects his father despite fearing that he has gone mad.
Navani Kholin: Widow of King Gavilar, mother of King Elhokar and Jasnah. A skilled artifabrian (one who creates devices known as fabrials). She has always loved Dalinar, even when she was married to his brother, Gavilar. She attempts to rekindle a relationship with Dalinar but is initially rebuffed; eventually she convinces Dalinar to embrace his feelings at the end of the book.

Prologue, epilogue and Interludes
Kalak is one of ten Heralds of the Almighty. His viewpoint chapter is the prelude which takes place 4,500 years before the events of the first chapter.
He is virtually immortal due to an interaction with magic.
Baxil is a thief of Emuli nationality, the cousin of Av. He and a beautiful lighteyes woman break into places to destroy artwork. 
Geranid is a scientist and philosopher. She lives with Ashir on a small Reshi island, where she spends her time studying .
Ishikk is a fisherman from the Purelake. He is approached by three strangers, who he calls Grump, Thinker and Blunt. They are using him as an agent to find a man named Hoid. 
Nan Balat is one of Shallan's brothers, a lighteyed Veden. After Nan Helaran, Balat's eldest brother, was proclaimed dead by their father, Balat gained the title 'Nan', making him first in line. 
Rysn is a young woman from Thaylenah, an apprentice merchant. She travels with Vstim to Shinovar. 
Wit, also known as Hoid, the Drifter, and Cephandrius, is the court jester of king Elhokar Kholin at the Shattered Plains. Wit's role as court jester simply allows him to insult everyone he meets, often by just deliberately discussing that person's worst character flaws openly. Wit is also secretly more than he seems, often possessing an omniscient knowledge of things he shouldn't, and the ability to know where to travel to meet important people and offer obscure but useful advice and information to those he briefly meets. Hoid is in all major books in the Cosmere, a universe where most works by Sanderson are set.

Reception

Critical response and sales
In its first week of release the book was #7 on The New York Times Best Seller list. In subsequent weeks the book was #11, #20, and #25.

The Way of Kings received critical acclaim and received praise for its extensive world-building. An early review from the website Unshelved gave the book a positive review. A review from Elitist Book Reviews pointed out some problems with the book, (black-and-white characters, too much exposition) but gave an overall positive opinion of the book. The website SFReviews.net gave the book a mixed review, praising Sanderson's writing and creativity, but criticizing its extreme length and overall dearth of action.

SF Reviews pointed out, "The ride is luxurious, the scenery is often breathtaking, but The Way of Kings is truly a long and winding road." KeepingTheDoor.com commented, "The Stormlight Archive is a series that, like Robert Jordan's The Wheel of Time, George R.R. Martin's A Song of Ice and Fire and Robin Hobb's The Realm of the Elderlings epics, every fantasy fan worth their salt must read and be familiar with. This will be one of the giant series that will help shape the entire scene."

Awards and nominations

Adaptations

Audiobook
An audiobook version was released in August 2010 by Macmillan Audio read by narrator team Kate Reading and Michael Kramer who have also read several other books written by Sanderson, including The Wheel of Time series. A 5-part GraphicAudio version of The Way of Kings was released from March to July 2016.

Film
In October 2016, the rights to the entire Cosmere universe were licensed by DMG Entertainment. DMG is fast-tracking an adaptation of The Way of Kings. Patrick Melton and Marcus Dunstan were hired as screenwriters. DMG founder Dan Mintz will produce the film, with Sanderson and Joshua Bilmes serving as executive producers.

Video game
A VR game, "The Way of Kings: Escape the Shattered Plains", developed by Arcturus VR, was released on March 2, 2018.

References

External links
 
 

2010 American novels
American fantasy novels
High fantasy novels
The Stormlight Archive
Tor Books books
Books with cover art by Michael Whelan
Novels set on fictional planets
Victor Gollancz Ltd books